Rank comparison chart of armies/ land forces of North and South American states.

Enlisted

See also
Comparative army officer ranks of the Americas
Ranks and insignia of NATO armies enlisted

References

Americas
Military comparisons